Morchella punctipes is a species of fungus in the family Morchellaceae native to North America. First described scientifically by American mycologist Charles Horton Peck in 1903, it is widely distributed east of the Rocky Mountains.

Morchella punctipes is one of three species of fungi commonly referred to as half-free morels, the others being Morchella populiphila in western North America and Morchella semilibera in Europe.

References

External links

punctipes
Edible fungi
Fungi described in 1903
Fungi of North America